Mutki District is a district of Bitlis Province of Turkey. Its seat is the town of Mutki. Its area is 1,069 km2, and its population is 30,940 (2021).

Composition
There are two municipalities in Mutki District:
 Kavakbaşı
 Mutki

There are 60 villages in Mutki District:

 Açıkalan
 Akçaağaç
 Akıncı
 Akpınar
 Alatoprak
 Alıcık
 Alkoyun
 Aydemir
 Bağarası
 Ballı
 Beşevler
 Boğazönü
 Bozburun
 Çatalerik
 Çatalsöğüt
 Çaygeçit
 Çayırlı
 Çiğdemalan
 Çığır
 Çitliyol
 Dağarcık
 Dağlık
 Dereyolu
 Ekizler
 Erler
 Geyikpınar
 Göztepe
 Gümüşkanat
 İkizler
 Kapaklı
 Kapıkaya
 Karabudak
 Kaşak
 Kaşıklı
 Kayabaşı
 Kayran
 Kocainiş
 Kovanlı
 Koyunlu
 Kuşdili
 Küllüce
 Meydan
 Oluklu
 Özenli
 Salman
 Sarıçiçek
 Sekiliyazı
 Taşboğaz
 Tolgalı
 Üçadım
 Uran
 Üstyayla
 Uzunyar
 Yalıntaş
 Yanıkçakır
 Yazıcık
 Yenidoğan
 Yeniköy
 Yumrumeşe
 Yuvalıdam

References

Districts of Bitlis Province